Euplatypus compositus is a species of pinhole borer in the family of beetles known as Curculionidae.

References

Further reading

External links

 

Platypodinae
Beetles described in 2002